The Yamaha DX100 is an FM synthesizer released by Yamaha in 1986.  It offers four operators for each of its eight voices, and has eight algorithms (compared to the DX7's six operators for each of its sixteen voices, and thirty-two algorithms). It has only 49 mini-keys, and no arpeggiator or effects, but is still useful, known in particular for its bass patch #1. It features up to 192 presets, seriously improving the DX7's limited preset capabilities. It can also store 24 user-programmable sounds in RAM. It lacks cartridge support, but voice patches can be saved to and loaded from an external cassette recorder.

It was the cheapest user-programmable FM synthesiser made in the 1980s, leading to its popularity even amongst professional musicians in the 80s and 90s.  It's essentially a cut down version of the DX21 and DX27, using the same FM chip.

Notable users
 Aphex Twin
 Juan Atkins
 Autechre
 Laurent Garnier
 Howard Jones 
 Jean-Michel Jarre
 Teddy Riley
 Orbital
Roger Troutman
Mark Mothersbaugh of Devo
Kraftwerk (during live performances)

See also
 Yamaha DX1
 Yamaha DX5
 Yamaha DX7
 Yamaha DX9
 Yamaha DX11
 Yamaha DX21
Yamaha DX27 / 27S

References

Further reading

External links 

 Yamaha black boxes: Yamaha DX100 digital programmable algorithm synthesizer

DX7
Polyphonic synthesizers
Digital synthesizers